Arnaud Clément and Michaël Llodra defeated the defending champions Bob and Mike Bryan in the final, 6–7(5–7), 6–3, 6–4, 6–4, to win the gentlemen's doubles title at the 2007 Wimbledon Championships The French duo won their first Grand Slam as a team, however this was Llodra's third, having won the Australian Open twice previously with Fabrice Santoro in 2003 and 2004.

Seeds

  Bob Bryan /  Mike Bryan (final)
  Jonas Björkman /  Max Mirnyi (first round)
  Mark Knowles /  Daniel Nestor (quarterfinals)
  Fabrice Santoro /  Nenad Zimonjić (semifinals)
  Martin Damm /  Leander Paes (quarterfinals)
  Paul Hanley /  Kevin Ullyett (second round)
  Jonathan Erlich /  Andy Ram (second round)
  Simon Aspelin /  Julian Knowle (first round)
  Lukáš Dlouhý /  Pavel Vízner (quarterfinals)
  Arnaud Clément /  Michaël Llodra (champions)
  Mahesh Bhupathi /  Radek Štěpánek (withdrew)
  Ashley Fisher /  Tripp Phillips (first round)
  Jaroslav Levinský /  David Škoch (third round)
  Jeff Coetzee /  Rogier Wassen (first round)
  Martín García /  Sebastián Prieto (second round)
  Mariusz Fyrstenberg /  Łukasz Kubot (second round)
  Yves Allegro /  Jim Thomas (first round)

Qualifying

Draw

Finals

Top half

Section 1

Section 2

Bottom half

Section 3

Section 4

References

External links

2007 Wimbledon Championships – Men's draws and results at the International Tennis Federation

Men's Doubles
Wimbledon Championship by year – Men's doubles